James Vincent McMorrow  is an Irish singer and songwriter.

Career
McMorrow's debut album, Early in the Morning, was released in Ireland in February 2010, and in the United States and Europe in 2011, to widespread acclaim. He made his UK television debut on BBC Two's Later... with Jools Holland on 27 May 2011. He played with Lisa Hannigan on 8 December 2011 at Dublin's Button Factory for the Choice Music Prize event.

In 2011, he co-wrote the song "Shells of Silver" with Northern Irish electronic group The Japanese Popstars, and his vocals are featured. The song is featured in Season 5, Episode 7 of the CW teen drama Gossip Girl.

In 2014, he released his second album, Post Tropical, which included the song "Glacier". The song was used in the 2014 Spanish Christmas Lottery advertising campaign. The studio is located on a pecan farm, and McMorrow found the location "the most surreal place to work", and one that helped add to the tone of the album and inspire his creativity. He said "I think it's kind of engrained in the record, more than any pinpointed thing. I can hear the hot bedded air in this part. You can hear the birds in the pianos."<ref name="mir">Ward, James. "Likely forecast looks as if Post Tropical will go down a storm". Irish Daily Mirror, January 10, 2014. Retrieved January 11, 2014.</ref>

In 2015, he composed a film score for the short, "Martha", directed by Sam Benenati. In 2016, his cover of the Chris Isaak song "Wicked Game" was used in the first official full-length trailer for the sixth season of the HBO hit series Game of Thrones.
In April 2016, he was featured on the promotional single "I'm in Love" from Kygo's debut album, Cloud Nine.In July 2016, McMorrow announced his third studio album and released "Rising Water", its lead single. We Move was produced by McMorrow, Nineteen85, Frank Dukes and Two Inch Punch, and was released on 2 September 2016. It marks a shift in McMorrow's style towards more R&B-tinged sounds. He released his fourth studio album True Care on 26 May 2017.

 Awards and nominations 
In January 2012, McMorrow received a European Border Breakers Award in recognition of Early In The Morning'' success beyond Ireland.

Discography

Studio albums

EPs

Singles

As lead artist

As featured artist

Songwriting and production credits

Notes

References

External links

 
 

1981 births
Irish folk musicians
Irish male singer-songwriters
Living people
Singers from Dublin (city)
Vagrant Records artists
Dew Process artists
21st-century Irish male singers
Bitbird artists